Rosewall Creek Provincial Park is a provincial park in British Columbia, Canada, located northwest of the community of Bowser.  The park is situated along picturesque Rosewall Creek, south of Fanny Bay on central Vancouver Island. The park features a mixture of coniferous trees interspersed with striking broad leaf maple trees. One of the best times to visit this park is in the fall when the color of the maple leaves makes an attractive backdrop for photographers.

This small day-use only park incorporates the Lieutenant Ian Philip MacDonald Picnic Area (managed by BC Parks), honouring a soldier from nearby Fanny Bay who was killed in WWII's Normandy Invasion (see photo for details).   Two picnic areas on either side of the creek are connected by a short riverside trail; one overlooks the creek and the other is situated at its edge.

The area is served by the coast-spanning Island Highway, and the Island Rail Corridor.

References

External links

Mid Vancouver Island
Provincial parks of British Columbia
1956 establishments in British Columbia
Protected areas established in 1956